Ferdinand Guillaume (1887–1977) was a French-born Italian actor and film director. He is often known by his stage name Polidor.

In 1910 after working for years in the family circus, he and his brother Natale were hired by Cines Studios where he starred in over a hundred comedy silent shorts billed as the character Tontolini. He then went to work for Pasquali Film in Turin.

Selected filmography
 The Palace on the River (1940)
 The Daughter of the Green Pirate (1940)
 Music on the Run (1943)
 The Mad Marechiaro (1952)
 Angel in a Taxi (1958)
 The Employee (1959)
 Everyone's in Love (1959)
 Red Roses for the Fuhrer (1968)

References

Bibliography
 Robert Stam & Alessandra Raengo. A Companion to Literature and Film. John Wiley & Sons, 2008.

External links

1887 births
1977 deaths
French film directors
French male film actors
Italian male film actors
People from Bayonne
French emigrants to Italy